Bank of Antigua was an Antigua-based bank that was owned by the Stanford Financial Group and was central to the Ponzi scheme run by Allen Stanford.  It was originally formed on the 10 February 1981 in St. John's.  When the Ponzi scheme was exposed in 2009, the bank was taken over by the Eastern Caribbean Central Bank (ECCB) on 20 February 2009.

The bank was renamed to the Eastern Caribbean Amalgamated Bank by the ECCB and they disposed of it in Nov 2011.

References

External links

BBC Antigua bank hit by fraud charge 
New York Times Bank of Antigua
Allen flight to Antigua cancelled

Bank failures
Economy of Antigua and Barbuda
Stanford Financial Group
Banks established in 1981
1981 establishments in Antigua and Barbuda
Banks disestablished in 2009
2009 disestablishments in Antigua and Barbuda
Defunct banks of Antigua and Barbuda